General elections were held in Japan on 1 October 1952. The result was a victory for the Liberal Party, which won 242 of the 466 seats. Voter turnout was 76.4%.

Results

By prefecture

References 

Japan
1952 elections in Japan
General elections in Japan
October 1952 events in Asia
Election and referendum articles with incomplete results